Little Brother or little brother may refer to:

Relationships
 Little brother, a male sibling who is younger in age - see birth order
 Little brother, a boy supported by a surrogate "big brother", through an organization such as Big Brothers Big Sisters of America

Literature
 Little Brother (Baillie novel), 1985, by Allan Baillie, a children's novel about life under the Khmer Rouge
 Little Brother, 1996, a novel by David Mason
 "Little Brother" (short story), 2001, by Walter Mosley
 Little Brother (Doctorow novel), a 2008 novel by Cory Doctorow

Religion
 Little Brothers of Francis, a Franciscan order in the Anglican Communion
 "Little Brother", a name for Franciscan Catholic orders
 Little Brothers of St. Francis, a Roman Catholic institute of religious brothers
 Little Brothers of the Lamb, a branch of a Roman Catholic religious institute, shaped both by Dominican and by Franciscan spirituality
 Little Brothers of the Good Shepherd, a Roman Catholic pontifical institute of religious brothers
 Little Brothers of the Gospel, a Roman Catholic congregation of religious brothers inspired by the life and writings of Charles de Foucauld
 Little Brothers of Jesus, a Roman Catholic religious order based on the life and teachings of Charles de Foucauld
 Little Brothers of Mary, an international community of Catholic religious institute of brothers

Organizations
 International Federation of Little Brothers of the Poor, an international federation of volunteer-based non-profit organizations, committed to relieving isolation and loneliness among the elderly
 Little Brothers – Friends of the Elderly, initially named Little Brothers of the Poor, a network of organizations located in the United States, member of the International Federation of Little Brothers of the Poor

Ships
 , a United States Navy tug in commission from 1917 to 1919

Film
 Little Brother (1927 film), a Soviet film directed by Grigori Kozintsev and Leonid Trauberg
 Little Brother (2014 film), a Canadian film directed by Rémi St-Michel

Music
 ARP Little Brother, a keyboardless monophonic synthesizer expander module
 Little Brother Montgomery (1906–1985), blues pianist
 Little Brother (group), a hip-hop group from North Carolina, USA

Albums
 Little Brother (EP) (2008), by punk band Dead to Me

Songs
 "Little Brother," a song from Neil Sedaka's 1974 album Sedaka's Back
 "Little Brother," a song from David Knopfler's 1983 album Release
 "Little Brother", a song from Grizzly Bear's 2006 album Yellow House
 "Little Brother", a song from The Future Sound of London's 1994 album Lifeforms
 "Little Brother", a song by Black Star for the 1999 film The Hurricane

See also
 "Little Bother", a 2022 song by King Princess featuring Fousheé